The Society for the Advancement of Judaism, also known as SAJ, is a synagogue and Jewish organization in New York City, on Manhattan's Upper West Side. Founded in 1922 by Rabbi Mordecai M. Kaplan, the founder of Reconstructionist Judaism, the synagogue is affiliated with the Reconstructionist Jewish movement.

The current rabbi is Lauren Grabelle Herrmann, who succeeded Michael Strassfeld on 1 July 2015.

Moshe Nathanson, composer of Hava Nagilah, was Cantor of the SAJ during Kaplan's tenure.

The first American Bat Mitzvah was held at the Society for the Advancement of Judaism on Saturday morning, March 18, 1922, for Judith Kaplan, daughter of Rabbi Mordecai Kaplan.

References

External links

Synagogue website
Society for the Advancement of Judaism records; I-70; American Jewish Historical Society, New York, NY, and Boston, MA.

Jewish organizations established in 1922
Synagogues in Manhattan
Jewish-American history
Upper West Side
Reconstructionist synagogues in New York City